Naser Azarkeyvan is an Iranian footballer who plays for Paykan in the IPL.

Club career
Azarkeyvan joined Paykan in 2009 after spending the previous season at Gostaresh Foolad on loan from Saipa.

 Assist Goals

References

Living people
Gostaresh Foulad F.C. players
Paykan F.C. players
Saipa F.C. players
Iranian footballers
Association football midfielders
Year of birth missing (living people)